The TCDD Open Air Steam Locomotive Museum is a railroad museum in Ankara, Turkey, which focuses on the history of steam locomotives that operated on the Turkish State Railways.  The museum was originally located in a park adjacent to Ankara Central Station, and when the property was needed for the station's enlargement project in 2014, the museum was moved to the current location near Wonderland Eurasia. The museum is owned and operated by the Turkish State Railways (TCDD), who also manages the Ankara Railway History Museum, as well as Atatürk's Car and Railway Art Museum.

Museum
Exhibits on display:

1909 Beuchelt & Co. (Germany) Wooden Passenger carriage
Restaurant carriage

See also
 Çamlık Railway Museum, another open air steam locomotive museum in Selçuk, Izmir Province
 Istanbul Railway Museum

References

 

Museums in Ankara
Railway museums in Turkey
Turkish State Railways
Open-air museums in Turkey